Natalia Kosmina or Natalya Kosmina (born November 8, 1982) is a Ukrainian para table tennis player.

References

1982 births
Living people
Sportspeople from Donetsk
Sportspeople from Mykolaiv
Ukrainian female table tennis players
Paralympic table tennis players of Ukraine
Medalists at the 2016 Summer Paralympics
Table tennis players at the 2016 Summer Paralympics
Paralympic medalists in table tennis
Paralympic gold medalists for Ukraine
Table tennis players at the 2020 Summer Paralympics
21st-century Ukrainian women